Kanmuri may refer to:

Kanmuri (headwear), a type of cap worn by Shinto clergy and courtiers in Japan
Mount Kanmuri (disambiguation), multiple mountains in Japan
, Japanese singer

Japanese-language surnames